The Fregeneda–Almendra pegmatitic field is a geologic area in the Iberian Peninsula extending across the Portuguese district of Guarda and the Spanish province of Salamanca. It consists of a variety of granitic pegmatites, where some rocks are rich in lithium. The Li minerals include spodumene, petalite, lithian muscovite and montebrasite.

A mining site for the extraction of lithium, tin, niobium and tantalium is located in La Fregeneda area.

Bibliography 
References

Bibliography
 
 
 
 

Geology of the Iberian Peninsula